The Penitential Act (capitalized in the Roman Missal) is a form of general confession of sinfulness that normally takes place at the beginning of the celebration of Mass in the Roman Rite.

In the English translation of the Roman Missal used from 1973 to 2011, it was called the Penitential Rite.

A "Brief Order of Confession" sometimes takes place at the start of Lutheran Divine Service, and may include an Absolution, giving it sacramental weight.

Roman Rite 
In the Order of Mass of the Roman Rite, which is the most widespread liturgical rite in the Catholic Church, the introductory part of Mass normally includes a Penitential Act after the making of the sign of the cross and the priest's greeting. The Roman Missal provides three forms. The priest begins each with an exhortation to acknowledge one's sinfulness as preparation for celebrating the sacred mysteries and he ends it with the prayer, "May almighty God have mercy on us, forgive us our sins, and bring us to everlasting life", a deprecatory absolution, as distinct from the declarative or indicative absolution, "I absolve you from your sins". Between these two interventions by the priest, sinfulness is acknowledged in one of three ways;
 Recitation of the Confiteor;
 A short prayer, beginning with "Have mercy on us, O Lord", recited alternately by priest and people;
 A short litany spoken or sung, not necessarily by the priest, to each of whose three variable invocations or tropes the people respond with the acclamation Kyrie, eleison or Christe, eleison (Lord, have mercy; Christ, have mercy)

The Penitential Act is followed by the Kyrie eleison chant (unless the third form of the Penitential Act has been chosen) and on solemnities and feasts by the Gloria.

If certain celebrations are combined with Mass, then the Penitential Act and other parts of the Introductory Rites are omitted or performed in a different way. An example is the Mass of Ash Wednesday, in which the Penitential Act is replaced by the blessing and imposition of ashes after the homily.

"On Sundays, especially in the Season of Easter, in place of the customary Penitential Act, from time to time the Blessing and Sprinkling of Water to recall Baptism may take place."

Tridentine Mass 

The Tridentine Roman Missal (editions from 1570 to 1962), which does not use the term "Penitential Act", has an equivalent, within the Prayers at the Foot of the Altar, in the Confiteor:

The priest says:

Text (in Latin)
Confiteor Deo omnipotenti, beatæ Mariæ semper Virgini, beato Michaeli Archangelo, beato Ioanni Baptistæ, sanctis Apostolis Petro et Paulo, omnibus Sanctis, et vobis, fratres: quia peccavi nimis cogitatione, verbo et opere: mea culpa, mea culpa, mea maxima culpa. Ideo precor beatam Mariam semper Virginem, beatum Michaelem Archangelum, beatum Ioannem Baptistam, sanctos Apostolos Petrum et Paulum, omnes Sanctos, et vos, fratres, orare pro me ad Dominum Deum nostrum.

An English translation (unofficial)
I confess to Almighty God, to blessed Mary ever Virgin, to blessed Michael the Archangel, to blessed John the Baptist, to the holy Apostles Peter and Paul, to all the Saints, and to you, brethren, that I have sinned exceedingly in thought, word and deed: through my fault, through my fault, through my most grievous fault. Therefore I beseech blessed Mary ever Virgin, blessed Michael the Archangel, blessed John the Baptist, the holy Apostles Peter and Paul, all the Saints, and you, brethren, to pray for me to the Lord our God.

Deacon and subdeacon at a solemn Mass, server(s) at a low Mass, or server(s) and people at a dialogue Mass respond:
Misereátur tui omnípotens Deus, et dimíssis peccátis tuis, perdúcat te ad vitam ætérnam (May Almighty God have mercy on you, forgive you your sins and bring you to everlasting life).

The Confiteor is then repeated by the others, replacing vobis fratres and vos fratres (you, brethren) with tibi pater and te pater (you, Father). The priest responds with two prayers: Misereátur vestri omnípotens Deus, et dimíssis peccátis vestris, perdúcat vos ad vitam ætérnam (May Almighty God have mercy on you, forgive you your sins and bring you to everlasting life) and (making the sign of the cross) Indulgéntiam, absolutiónem, et remissiónem peccatórum nostrórum, tríbuat nobis omnípotens et miséricors Dóminus (May the Almighty and Merciful Lord grant us pardon, absolution, and remission of our sins).

In the original Tridentine Roman Missal (1570), the Misereatur prayer added the adjective omnibus ("all") to the phrase dimissis peccatis tuis/vestris ("forgive you [all] your sins").

Usage in Lutheranism

Beliefs
Martin Luther viewed the requirement of private confession before receiving the Eucharist as coercive, and instead encouraged his followers to confess privately when they were particularly troubled. In lieu of private, individual confession, many forms of Lutheran Divine Service begin with a brief order of confession. The pastor and congregation say a Confiteor and the pastor may make a Declaration of Grace or an Absolution. If an absolution is spoken, the brief order of confession is understood to be sacramental. However, if private, individual confession is a common practice in a congregation, the brief order of confession may always be omitted.

As in the Roman Rite, a Thanksgiving for Baptism (similar to the Blessing and Sprinkling of Water) may replace the brief order of confession.

Formula
Below is an example, taken from the Lutheran Service Book, Divine Service Setting I

References 

Order of Mass
Catholic penitential practices